Alice Leake (born 1991) is a British orienteering competitor. She received a bronze medal in the Sprint discipline at the 2022 World Orienteering Championships, behind Megan Carter Davies and Simona Aebersold.

Leake's medal came after a series of improving performances at World Championships events, coming 8th in sprint at the 2018 World Orienteering Championships and 4th at the next sprint World Championships in 2021, before receiving a bronze medal at the championships in 2022. She first competed for British Orienteering at the 2015 World Orienteering Championships.

Leake competes for the Airienteers and Southern Navigators orienteering clubs. She has also been a member of Edinburgh University Orienteering Club, and has won both the British Orienteering Championships and the Jan Kjellström Orienteering Festival.

References

1991 births
Living people
British orienteers
Female orienteers
Foot orienteers
World Orienteering Championships medalists
20th-century British women
21st-century British women